Mount Pantokrator (sometimes Pantocrator, Pantōkrator, Παντοκράτωρ in Greek) is a mountain located in north-eastern Corfu. At , it is the highest mountain on the island. At the summit, the whole of Corfu can be seen, as well as Albania which lies a short distance from the island. At the top there is a café for tourists, a telecommunications station, whose largest tower stands directly over a well, and a monastery. The first monastery on the site was Angevin, built in 1347 but then destroyed sometime around 1537. The current church on the site dates from around 1689, and the current facade was built during the 19th century. It is dedicated to the transfiguration of Christ. To get to the peak, you can either drive to Mount Pantokrator up a series of windy roads from the coast, or walk to the top. If you choose to walk, one of the best places to start is in Old Perithia, Corfu's oldest village, where it takes approximately 2 hours round trip. The village of Old Perithia dates back to the 14th century and the 'Perithians' helped build the original monastery using local wood and limestone. The village of Old Perithia (and the now abandoned village of Sinies) can be seen from Pantokrator and with its 130 house and 8 churches Old Perithia is said to sit at the foot of Pantokrator, 'The Almighty.' The walk to Pantokrator from Spartilas is part of The Corfu Trail, an established long distance walking route of about 200 km from South to North Corfu. It's also possible to walk from Old Perithia to the summit of Pantokrator.

Gallery

References

External links 
 View from Mount Pantokrator
 Old Perithia Official site and Guide
 Old Perithia, the ghost village
 
 
 
 

Corfu
Landforms of Corfu (regional unit)
Pantokrator